ORP Wicher was a Project 30bis destroyer, transferred to the People's Republic of Poland from the Soviet Union in 1958. She was built by the Zhdanov shipyard in Leningrad and originally commissioned into the Soviet Baltic Fleet as the Skoryy ("Rapid") in 1951, and transferred to Poland in 1958 together with a second ship, . The ship was decommissioned in 1975, and scrapped. One of the 130 mm guns is preserved in the Polish Navy Museum in Gdynia. Remainings of the scrapped vessel were sunk at the beach in Hel as breakwater, where they remain to this day.

References

1949 ships
Skoryy-class destroyers of the Polish Navy
Cold War destroyers of Poland
Ships built in the Soviet Union
Ships built at Severnaya Verf

Shipwrecks of Poland